Peter Wolff (born 10 May 1946) is a politician and attorney from Liechtenstein. He was the Speaker of the Landtag of Liechtenstein (the national Parliament) from January 1997 to December 2000. 

Wolff belongs to the Patriotic Union and represented Schaan in the Landtag. He was a member of the Landtag from 1993 to 2005.

References

External links

Members of the Landtag of Liechtenstein
Speakers of the Landtag of Liechtenstein
Patriotic Union (Liechtenstein) politicians
Living people
1946 births